The 22411/22412 Naharlagun–Anand Vihar Terminal Arunachal AC Express is an AC Express train connecting Delhi and Naharlagun in Arunachal Pradesh.

This is the first fully air conditioned train connecting Arunachal Pradesh to Delhi and touching Assam, West Bengal, Bihar, Uttar Pradesh.

Stops

DELHI:
Anand Vihar Terminal (Delhi) (originates)

UTTAR PRADESH
  
 Lucknow 
 

BIHAR  
   
   
   
   
 Katihar Junction railway station 

WEST BENGAL
 New Jalpaiguri (Siliguri)  
 New Coochbehar

ASSAM
 New Bongaigaon  
 Rangiya Junction railway station 
 Udalguri
 Rangapara North Junction railway station
 Harmuti Junction railway station

ARUNACHAL PRADESH
 Naharlagun railway station (terminates)

Coaches
The 22412/11 Delhi–Naharlagun Arunachal AC Express has 1 AC First Class, 4 AC 2 tier, 13 AC 3 tier & 2 End on Generator LHB coach. In addition, it carries a pantry car coach.

Timetable 

22411 – Leaves Naharlagun every Tuesday, Saturday at 21:35 hrs and reaches Delhi on Thursday, Monday at 11:30 AM IST
22412 – Leaves Delhi (Anand Vihar Terminal) every Sunday, Thursday at 16:45 hrs and reaches Naharlagun Arunachal Pradesh on Tuesday, Saturday at 6:55 AM IST

Traction
Two locomotives are assigned to this train as the route is not fully electrified.

Gallery

References

Transport in Itanagar
Transport in Delhi
AC Express (Indian Railways) trains
Rail transport in Delhi
Rail transport in Uttar Pradesh
Rail transport in Bihar
Rail transport in West Bengal
Rail transport in Arunachal Pradesh
Rail transport in Assam
Railway services introduced in 2017